Bâtard is a French restaurant in New York City. The restaurant opened in 2014, replacing French restaurant Corton. 


History
The space occupied by Bâtard was formerly home to the restaurants Montrachet and Corton. Drew Nieporent operated both before founding Bâtard. Corton closed in 2013 after its chef, Paul Liebrandt, departed to work at another restaurant. Like Montrachet and Corton, he restaurant's name refers to the a grand cru vineyard, in this case  Bâtard-Montrachet. The word also means "bastard" in French.

After the closure of Corton, Nieporent considered several proposals for the space before receiving one from chef Markus Glocker and John Winterman.  In an effort not to compete with the legacy of Corton, which was formal, Bâtard aims to serve "approachable" food. Bâtard opened in 2014, garnering comparisons to Montracet. Glocker, the head chef, began splitting his time between Bâtard and the restaurant Augustine in 2018. The restaurant closed temporarily twice during the COVID-19 pandemic.

Reviews and accolades

Reviews
The restaurant received three stars from New York Times reviewer Pete Wells. Other critics have commented favorably on Bâtard's affordability.

Accolades
The restaurant earned a Michelin star for the first time in 2014, and as of 2022 has retained that rating each year since. At the 2015 James Beard Foundation gala, Bâtard was voted 2014's best new restaurant.

See also
List of Michelin starred restaurants in New York City

References

External links

2014 establishments in New York City
Michelin Guide starred restaurants in New York (state)
Restaurants in Manhattan
Restaurants established in 2014
French restaurants in New York City